= Gol Bezan =

Iranian football podcast

- Genre: Iranian Football
- Format: Audio; Video
- Language: English; Persian

Publication
- No. of episodes: 223 (as of December 24, 2025)
- Original release: June 14, 2014

Related
- Website: golbezanpodcast.com

Gol Bezan Persian: گل بزن is an Iranian football podcast in English and Persian created in 2014. Gol Bezan offers match analysis on the Iran national football team and interviews which have been regularly quoted by notable Iranian sports outlets.
